Pepe Serna (born July 23, 1944) is an American film and television actor and artist.

Serna's first break in movies came in 1970 on the Roger Corman directed film The Student Nurses. Over the years Serna has appeared in over 100 films. In the blockbuster comedy The Jerk, he appeared as a lowrider-driving criminal who cons a naive Steve Martin out of money and new tires. Perhaps his most notable role was in Scarface directed by Brian De Palma. Serna played Tony Montana's friend Angel Fernandez, who is dismembered with a chainsaw in the film's most famous scene. In the award-winning comedy Aguruphobia, Pepe played the charismatic guru Nanak. Pepe co-produced Aguruphobia. Aguruphobia had a limited theatrical run, and is now available on iTunes, Amazon, Google Play and Verizon Fios. He has also appeared on stage, including his solo show El Ruco, Chuco, Cholo, Pachuco which is Serna's version of the panorama of Latino cultural history.

Serna has been honored by the Screen Actors Guild Heritage Achievement Award; the League of United Latin American Citizens, and the Estrella Award for Arts & Culture from the Orange County Hispanic Chamber of Commerce. Pepe played Señor Cárdenas in the movie Downsizing.

Filmography

 1970 The Student Nurses as Luis
 1971 Red Sky at Morning as Chango Lopez
 1971 Johnny Got His Gun as Jose (uncredited)
 1971 Shoot Out as Pepe
 1972 The New Centurions as Young Mexican Man
 1973 Group Marriage as Ramon
 1973 Miracle on 34th Street (TV movie) as Y Leader
 1974 The Last Angry Man (TV movie) as Charlie Parelli
 1974 Hangup as Enrique
 1974 The Gun (TV movie) as Natcho
 1975 The Desperate Miles (TV movie) as Ruiz
 1975 The Day of the Locust as Miguel
 1975 The Deadly Tower (TV movie) as Mano
 1975 Adam-12 as Roger 
 1976 Swashbuckler as Street Entertainer
 1976 Rockford Files as Ray Ochoa 
 1976 The Killer Inside Me as Johnny Lopez
 1976 Car Wash as Chuco
 1977 Tarantulas: The Deadly Cargo (TV movie) as Illegal Immigrant (uncredited)
 1978 Roots of Blood as Juan
 1978 The Paper Chase as Luis Sanchez<ref>[https://www.youtube.com/watch?v=z_Rj_lkjbV4 The Paper Chase," Season 1, Episode 5, "Voices of Silence" (YouTube)]</ref>
 1979 A Force of One as Orlando
 1979 Walk Proud as Cesar
 1979 The Streets of L.A. (TV movie) as Sergeant Castro
 1979 The Jerk as Punk #1
 1980 City in Fear (TV movie) as Raymond Zavala
 1980 Honeysuckle Rose as "Rooster"
 1980 Inside Moves as Herrada
 1981 Three Hundred Miles for Stephanie (TV movie) as Bobby Hernandez
 1981 The Monkey Mission (TV movie) as Vito
 1982 The Ballad of Gregorio Cortez (TV movie) as Romaldo Cortez
 1982 Vice Squad as Detective  Pete Mendez
 1982 American Playhouse as Seguin
 1983 Sadat (TV movie) as Atif Sadat
 1983 White Water Rebels (TV movie) as Harry Cutter
 1983 Heartbreaker as "Loco"
 1983 Deal of the Century as Vardis
 1983 Scarface as Angel Fernandez
 1984 Best Kept Secrets (TV movie) as Jim Ramos
 1984 The Adventures of Buckaroo Banzai Across the 8th Dimension as Reno Nevada
 1984 Red Dawn as Aardvark's Father
 1985 Fandango as Gas Station Mechanic
 1985 Silverado as "Scruffy"
 1985 Streets of Justice (TV movie) as Detective Almos
 1986 Out of Bounds as Murano
 1986 A Year in the Life (TV mini-series) as Carlos
 1986-1987 Miami Vice episodes "Yankee Dollar" and "Down For the Count" as Zabado / Oswaldo Guzman
 1987 Hunter episode "Renegade"
 1987 The Three Kings (TV movie) as Alex Sweetwood
 1988 The Fortunate Pilgrim (TV mini-series) as John Colluci
 1988 Caddyshack II as Carlos
 1988 Break of Dawn (TV movie) as Hector
 1988 Human Error 1989 The Forgotten (TV movie) as Sergeant Pepe Gutierrez
 1990 Drug Wars: The Camarena Story (TV mini-series)
 1990 Bad Jim as Virgilio Segura
 1990 Postcards from the Edge as Raoul
 1990 The Rookie as Lieutenant Raymond Garcia
 1991 Hot Summer Winds (TV movie) as Marpo
 1991 Conagher (TV movie) as Casuse, Ladder Five Rider 
 1992 American Me as "Mundo"
 1992 Only You as Dock Official
 1991-1993 Dark Water (TV series) (voice)
 1993-1994 Second Chances (TV series) as Salvador Lopez
 1993 Roosters (voice)
 1994 A Million to Juan as Mr. Ortiz
 1995 A Blast From the Past as Captain Collins
 1995 In the Flesh as Harlan Ramirez
 1996 Land of Milk and Honey as Danny
 1997 The Brave as Alessandro
 2000 Luminarias as Rick
 2000 Bread and Roses as Restaurateur
 2000 Picking Up the Pieces as Florencio
 2000 Along for the Ride as Dr. Sanchez
 1999-2000 The PJs (TV series) as Mr. Sanchez (voice)
 2000 The Princess & the Barrio Boy (TV movie) as Bum
 2000 Rapid Transit as Herman Ortiz
 2001 The Next Gen as Stevedore (voice)
 2002 You Got Nothin' as Carlos
 2003 Kingpin (TV mini-series) as Jorge Romo
 2003 Deadly Swarm as Commandante Alvarez
 2003 Exposed as Raoul
 2003 Devil's KnighT as Hector Rivera
 2004 Latin Dragon as Hector "The Latin Dragon" Sanchez
 2005 Manejar (short) as Moises
 2006 The Virgin of Juarez as Eduardo Morales
 2006 The Black Dahlia as Tomas Dos Santos
 2006 Just Cause (video game) as Generic Voices (voice)
 2006 Big Dreams Little Tokyo as Mr. GonzalezDouble Tap (2006)
 2008 Moe as Older Man
 2009 White on Rice as Professor Berk
 2010 Dreamkiller 2014 Man from Reno as Paul Del Moral
 2014 Cake as Nuncio
 2015 Ana Maria in Novela Land as Father Miguel
 2015 Kill or Be Killed as Rudy Goebel
 2015 Road to Juarez as Fortunato
 2015 Aguruphobia as Nanak
 2016 Restored Me as Manny
 2016 Gino's Wife as Gino
 2016 Monday Nights at Seven as Paul
 2016 Superpowerless as Dr. George Holst
 2017 Downsizing'' as Señor Cárdenas

References

External links

1944 births
Living people
American male actors of Mexican descent
American male film actors
American male television actors
Male actors from Texas
People from Corpus Christi, Texas
20th-century American male actors
21st-century American male actors